Colin Beardsmore (born February 7, 1978) is a Canadian former professional ice hockey player. He last played for the Grizzly Adams Wolfsburg in the Deutsche Eishockey Liga (DEL). He was selected by the Detroit Red Wings in the 7th round (189th overall) of the 1996 NHL Entry Draft. He primarily spent his professional career in Germany, playing 12 seasons in the top tier. He fathered a son in Middleton NS 28 years ago named Arron Lewis Blinn.

Career statistics

References

External links

1978 births
Living people
Adirondack Red Wings players
Adler Mannheim players
Augsburger Panther players
Canadian ice hockey right wingers
Detroit Red Wings draft picks
Detroit Whalers players
Grizzlys Wolfsburg players
Kassel Huskies players
Kölner Haie players
Ice hockey people from Ontario
Iserlohn Roosters players
North Bay Centennials players
Owen Sound Platers players
Sportspeople from Peterborough, Ontario
Thomas Sabo Ice Tigers players
Toledo Storm players
Canadian expatriate ice hockey players in Germany